Hero – Beyond the Boundary of Time is a 1993 Hong Kong comedy film directed by Blackie Ko. The film is a spin-off of Louis Cha's novel The Deer and the Cauldron, with Tony Leung reprising his role as "Wai Siu-bo" from the 1984 television series adaption of the same novel. The Chinese title literally translates to The Genuine Wai Siu-bo flirts with women on the Emperor's order. Some say it's a parodic prequel of Yuen Biao's The Iceman Cometh.

Plot
Under orders from the emperor, Wai Siu-Bo time travels to modern-day Hong Kong investigate and avert an upcoming crisis.

Cast
 Tony Leung as Wai Siu-bo
 Dicky Cheung as Chiu
 Ng Suet-man as Siu Ha
 Veronica Yip as Princess
 Kent Tong as Kangxi Emperor
 Lee Fai as Shang
 Kim Won-jin as Yuen Chun
 Chang Gan-wing as Uncle Wah
 Jamie Luk as Loan Shark Hung
 Lee Yuet-sin as Mrs Hung
 Billy Ching as Choi
 Gilbert Lam as Ha's ex-boyfriend
 Yeung Qui-lee as Ha's ex's new girlfriend
 Wong Man-shing as Hung's thug
 Sophia M. Crawford as Kwai's killer
 Fong Yue as villager
 So Wai-naam as Choi's thug
 Lam Kwok-git as Choi's thug
 Leung Kai-chi as antique dealer
 Lui Siu-ming as antique salesman
 Simon Cheung as policeman
 Wong Si-man
 Chiu Tat-san
 Tania Wong
 Alan Lo
 Lo Ka-seun

References

External links
 
 

Vietnamese Title : Tân Vi Tiểu Bảo

1993 films
Films based on works by Jin Yong
Hong Kong slapstick comedy films
Hong Kong martial arts comedy films
Works based on The Deer and the Cauldron
Wuxia films
Films about time travel
Films based on Chinese novels
Films set in the Qing dynasty
1990s adventure comedy films
1993 martial arts films
Films set in the 1990s
Films set in Hong Kong
Films shot in Hong Kong
1993 comedy films
Films directed by Blackie Ko
1990s Hong Kong films